VOAR may refer to:

VOAR (AM), a Canadian AM radio station
Arakkonam Naval Air Station, the ICAO code for the base in India